Staroamirovo (İśke Ämir) is a rural locality (a village) in Pervomaysky Selsoviet, Blagovarsky District, Bashkortostan, Russia. The population was 17 as of 2010. There is 1 street.

Geography 
Staroamirovo is located 30 km southwest of Yazykovo (the district's administrative centre) by road. Starye Sanny is the nearest rural locality.

References 

Rural localities in Blagovarsky District